The following is a list of episodes 63–95 of the anime series Rurouni Kenshin, based on the manga series of the same name by Nobuhiro Watsuki. They aired in Japan, with the exception of episode 95, on Fuji TV from October 14, 1997, until the series concluded on October 15, 1998. Directed by Kazuhiro Furuhashi and produced by Aniplex and Fuji TV, the anime is set during the early Meiji period in Japan and follows the story of a fictional assassin named Himura Kenshin, who becomes a wanderer to protect the people of Japan. Unlike previous episodes, these were not adapted from the manga.  During that period, the Jinchu Arc was still being written and one more final episode was missing by the end of the anime fillers. Studio Deen, who later animated the Trust & Betrayal, Reflections and New Kyoto Arc OVAs would replace Studio Gallop on animation production starting with episode 67.

The series was licensed for broadcast and home video release in North America by Media Blasters, who split it up into "seasons". Unlike the previous seasons of the series, the English dub of the final season was not aired in North America. Episode 95 did not air in Japan either, as it was a bonus episode for the VHS and DVD releases, it also has a different art style than the rest of the anime. Media Blasters released this season within DVDs seven to fourteen of the anime from February 26, 2002, to September 24, 2002. A DVD compilation of season 2 was released on January 17, 2006.

These episodes of the series use five pieces of theme music. The opening theme "1/2" by Makoto Kawamoto continues to be used until episode 66 when it replaced with the series' final opening theme "Kimi ni Fureru Dake de" by Curio. "It's Gonna Rain" by Bonnie Pink continues to be used as the ending theme for the first four episodes when it is replaced with "1/3 no Junjou na Kanjou" by Siam Shade. The series final ending theme, "Dame" by You Izumi, begins use at episode 83.


Episode list

References
General
 

Specific

1997 Japanese television seasons
1998 Japanese television seasons
Season 3